St. Xavier's High School is a private Catholic secondary school located in Darsi, Andhra Pradesh, India. Established in 1993 by the Society of Jesus, the school serves 500 tribal and Dalit children who had little educational opportunity. The school depends on financial contributions for its maintenance.

History
In 1993, the Jesuit Fr. Peter Daniel began this school mainly for the low caste Dalit working children. The school is in a very underdeveloped area of the Jesuit Darsi Mission, in the Prakasam district of Andhra Pradesh, and accommodates more than 500 children.

Many families in this area are not educated or conscious of the value of education, and economic pressures force them to involve their children in farm work and herding water buffalo from a young age. Girls often leave school to look after younger children and many boys leave at school at age 13 to assist with the family labour, which fills about 150 days a year depending on the monsoon season.

Darsi school offers a secondary education to the poorest children. It admits children with disabilities or affected by HIV, offers tutors especially for those children whose parents are illiterate, and provides free boarding facilities. The school, along with meals and health care, are sustained by charitable donations. Donations from the UK provided for a reverse osmosis water purifying plant to make clean drinking water available to the students.

Separate hostels house 446 Dalit boys and girls while they attend St. Xavier's High School. It is a private school without government funding for teachers' salaries, but some students are assisted by Andhra Pradesh government hostel facilities that are open to several schools.

See also

 List of Jesuit schools
 List of schools named after Francis Xavier

References  

Private schools in Andhra Pradesh
Christian schools in Andhra Pradesh
Jesuit secondary schools in India
Schools in Prakasam district
Jesuit development centres
1993 establishments in Andhra Pradesh
Educational institutions established in 1993